Shrimp are crustaceans (a form of shellfish) with elongated bodies and a primarily swimming mode of locomotion – most commonly Caridea and Dendrobranchiata of the decapod order, although some  crustaceans outside of this order  are referred to as "shrimp". 

More narrow definitions may be restricted to Caridea, to smaller species of either group or to only the marine species. Under a broader definition, shrimp may be synonymous with prawn, covering stalk-eyed swimming crustaceans with long, narrow muscular tails (abdomens), long whiskers (antennae), and slender legs. Any small crustacean which resembles a shrimp tends to be called one. They swim forward by paddling with swimmerets on the underside of their abdomens, although their escape response is typically repeated flicks with the tail driving them backwards very quickly. Crabs and lobsters have strong walking legs, whereas shrimp have thin, fragile legs which they use primarily for perching.

Shrimp are widespread and abundant. There are thousands of species adapted to a wide range of habitats. They can be found feeding near the seafloor on most coasts and estuaries, as well as in rivers and lakes. To escape predators, some species flip off the seafloor and dive into the sediment. They usually live from one to seven years. Shrimp are often solitary, though they can form large schools during the spawning season.

They play important roles in the food chain and are an important food source for larger animals ranging from fish to whales. The muscular tails of many shrimp are edible to humans, and they are widely caught and farmed for human consumption. Commercial shrimp species support an industry worth 50 billion dollars a year, and in 2010 the total commercial production of shrimp was nearly 7 million tonnes. Shrimp farming became more prevalent during the 1980s, particularly in China, and by 2007 the harvest from shrimp farms exceeded the capture of wild shrimp. There are significant issues with excessive bycatch when shrimp are captured in the wild, and with pollution damage done to estuaries when they are used to support shrimp farming. Larger shrimp are more likely to be targeted commercially and are often referred to as prawns, particularly in the Commonwealth of Nations and former British colonies.

Classification 

Shrimp are swimming crustaceans with long narrow muscular abdomens and long antennae. Unlike crabs and lobsters, shrimp have well developed pleopods (swimmerets) and slender walking legs; they are more adapted for swimming than walking. Historically, it was the distinction between walking and swimming that formed the primary taxonomic division into the former suborders Natantia and Reptantia. Members of the Natantia (shrimp in the broader sense) were adapted for swimming while the Reptantia (crabs, lobsters, etc.) were adapted for crawling or walking. Some other groups also have common names that include the word "shrimp"; any small swimming crustacean resembling a shrimp tends to be called one.

Description 

The following description refers mainly to the external anatomy of the common European shrimp, Crangon crangon, as a typical example of a decapod shrimp. The body of the shrimp is divided into two main parts: the head and thorax which are fused together to form the cephalothorax, and a long narrow abdomen. The shell which protects the cephalothorax is harder and thicker than the shell elsewhere on the shrimp and is called the carapace. The carapace typically surrounds the gills, through which water is pumped by the action of the mouthparts. The rostrum, eyes, whiskers and legs also issue from the carapace. The rostrum, from the Latin rōstrum meaning beak, looks like a beak or pointed nose at the front of the shrimp's head. It is a rigid forward extension of the carapace and can be used for attack or defense. It may also stabilize the shrimp when it swims backward. Two bulbous eyes on stalks sit either side of the rostrum. These are compound eyes which have panoramic vision and are very good at detecting movement. Two pairs of whiskers (antennae) also issue from the head. One of these pairs is very long and can be twice the length of the shrimp, while the other pair is quite short. The antennae have sensors on them which allow the shrimp to feel where they touch, and also allow them to "smell" or "taste" things by sampling the chemicals in the water. The long antennae help the shrimp orient itself with regard to its immediate surroundings, while the short antennae help assess the suitability of prey.

Eight pairs of appendages issue from the cephalothorax. The first three pairs, the maxillipeds, Latin for "jaw feet", are used as mouthparts. In Crangon crangon, the first pair, the maxillula, pumps water into the gill cavity. After the maxilliped come five more pairs of appendages, the pereiopods. These form the ten decapod legs. In Crangon crangon, the first two pairs of pereiopods have claws or chela. The chela can grasp food items and bring them to the mouth. They can also be used for fighting and grooming. The remaining four legs are long and slender, and are used for walking or perching.

The muscular abdomen has six segments and has a thinner shell than the carapace. Each segment has a separate overlapping shell, which can be transparent. The first five segments each have a pair of appendages on the underside, which are shaped like paddles and are used for swimming forward. The appendages are called pleopods or swimmerets, and can be used for purposes other than swimming. Some shrimp species use them for brooding eggs, others have gills on them for breathing, and the males in some species use the first pair or two for insemination. The sixth segment terminates in the telson flanked by two pairs of appendages called the uropods. The uropods allow the shrimp to swim backward, and function like rudders, steering the shrimp when it swims forward. Together, the telson and uropods form a splayed tail fan. If a shrimp is alarmed, it can flex its tail fan in a rapid movement. This results in a backward dart called the caridoid escape reaction (lobstering).

Habitat 
Shrimp are widespread, and can be found near the seafloor of most coasts and estuaries, as well as in rivers and lakes. There are numerous species, and usually there is a species adapted to any particular habitat. Most shrimp species are marine, although about a quarter of the described species are found in fresh water. Although shrimp are almost entirely fully aquatic, the two species of Merguia are semi-terrestrial and spend a significant part of their life on land in mangrove.

Behaviour 
There are many variations in the ways different types of shrimp look and behave. Even within the core group of caridean shrimp, the small delicate Pederson's shrimp (above) looks and behaves quite unlike the large commercial pink shrimp or the snapping pistol shrimp. The caridean family of pistol shrimp are characterized by big asymmetrical claws, the larger of which can produce a loud snapping sound. The family is diverse and worldwide in distribution, consisting of about 600 species. Colonies of snapping shrimp are a major source of noise in the ocean and can interfere with sonar and underwater communication. The small emperor shrimp has a symbiotic relationship with sea slugs and sea cucumbers, and may help keep them clear of ectoparasites.

Most shrimp are omnivorous, but some are specialised for particular modes of feeding. Some are filter feeders, using their setose (bristly) legs as a sieve; some scrape algae from rocks. Cleaner shrimp feed on the parasites and necrotic tissue of the reef fish they groom. Some species of shrimp are known to cannibalize others as well if other food sources are not readily available. In turn, shrimp are eaten by various animals, particularly fish and seabirds, and frequently host bopyrid parasites.

Mating 
Females of the freshwater shrimp Caridina ensifera are capable of storing sperm from multiple partners, and thus can produce progeny with different paternities.  Reproductive success of sires was found to correlate inversely with their genetic relatedness to the mother.  This finding suggests that sperm competition and/or pre- and post-copulatory female choice occurs.  Female choice may increase the fitness of progeny by reducing inbreeding depression that ordinarily results from the expression of homozygous deleterious recessive mutations.

Species

Decapods 
There is little agreement among taxonomists concerning the phylogeny of crustaceans. Within the decapods "every study gives totally different results. Nor do even one of these studies match any of the rival morphology studies". Some taxonomists identify shrimp with the infraorder Caridea and prawns with the suborder Dendrobranchiata. While different experts give different answers, there is no disagreement that the caridean species are shrimp. There are over 3000 caridean species. Occasionally they are referred to as "true shrimp".

Traditionally decapods were divided into two suborders: the Natantia (or swimmers), and the Reptantia (or walkers). The Natantia or swimmers included the shrimp. They were defined by their abdomen which, together with its appendages was well adapted for swimming. The Reptantia or walkers included the crabs and lobsters. These species have small abdominal appendages, but robust legs well adapted for walking. The Natantia was thought to be paraphyletic, that is, it was thought that originally all decapods were like shrimp.

However, classifications are now based on clades, and the paraphyletic suborder Natantia has been discontinued. "On this basis, taxonomic classifications now divide the order Decapoda into the two suborders: Dendrobranchiata for the largest shrimp clade, and Pleocyemata for all other decapods. The Pleocyemata are in turn divided into half a dozen infra-orders"

 The taxonomists De Grave and Fransen, 2011, recognise four major groups of shrimp: the suborder Dendrobranchiata and the infraorders Procarididea, Stenopodidea and Caridea". This group is identical to the traditional Natantia group, and contains decapods only.
 All shrimp of commercial interest belong to the Natantia. The FAO determine the categories and terminology used in the reporting of global fisheries. They define a shrimp as a "decapod crustacean of the suborder Natantia".
 According to the Codex Alimentarius Commission of the FAO and WHO: "The term shrimp (which includes the frequently used term prawn) refers to the species covered by the most recent edition of the FAO listing of shrimp, FAO Species Catalogue, Volume 1, Shrimps and prawns of the world, an annotated catalogue of species of interest to fisheries FAO Fisheries Synopsis No. 125." In turn, the Species Catalogue says the highest category it deals with is "the suborder Natantia of the order Crustacea Decapoda to which all shrimps and prawns belong".

Other decapod crustaceans also called shrimp, are the ghost or mud shrimp belonging to the infra-order Thalassinidea. In Australia they are called yabbies. The monophyly of the group is not certain; recent studies have suggested dividing the group into two infraorders, Gebiidea and Axiidea.

Non-decapods 

A wide variety of non-decapod crustaceans are also commonly referred to as shrimp. This includes the brine shrimp, clam shrimp, fairy shrimp and tadpole shrimp belonging to the branchiopods, the lophogastridan shrimp, opossum shrimp and skeleton shrimp belonging the Malacostraca; and seed shrimp which are ostracods. Many of these species look quite unlike the commercial decapod shrimp that are eaten as seafood. For example, skeleton shrimp have short legs and a slender tail like a scorpion tail, fairy shrimp swim upside down with swimming appendages that look like leaves, and the tiny seed shrimp have bivalved carapaces which they can open or close. Krill resemble miniature shrimp, and are sometimes called "krill shrimp".

Some mantis shrimp are a foot long, and have bulging eyes, a flattened tail and formidable claws equipped with clubs or sharp spikes, which it can use to knock out its opponents.

Human uses

History 

In 1991, archeologists suggested that ancient raised paved areas near the coast in Chiapas, Mexico, were platforms used for drying shrimp in the sun, and that adjacent clay hearths were used to dry the shrimp when there was no sun. The evidence was circumstantial, because the chitinous shells of shrimp are so thin they degrade rapidly, leaving no fossil remains. In 1985 Quitmyer and others found direct evidence dating back to 600 AD for shrimping off the southeastern coast of North America, by successfully identifying shrimp from the archaeological remains of their mandibles (jaws). Clay vessels with shrimp decorations have been found in the ruins of Pompeii. In the 3rd century AD, the Greek author Athenaeus wrote in his literary work, Deipnosophistae; "... of all fish the daintiest is a young shrimp in fig leaves."

In North America, indigenous peoples of the Americas captured shrimp and other crustaceans in fishing weirs and traps made from branches and Spanish moss, or used nets woven with fibre beaten from plants. At the same time early European settlers, oblivious to the "protein-rich coasts" all about them, starved from lack of protein. In 1735 beach seines were imported from France, and Cajun fishermen in Louisiana started catching white shrimp and drying them in the sun, as they still do today. In the mid nineteenth century, Chinese immigrants arrived for the California Gold Rush, many from the Pearl River Delta where netting small shrimp had been a tradition for centuries. Some immigrants starting catching shrimp local to San Francisco Bay, particularly the small inch long Crangon franciscorum. These shrimp burrow into the sand to hide, and can be present in high numbers without appearing to be so. The catch was dried in the sun and was exported to China or sold to the Chinese community in the United States. This was the beginning of the American shrimping industry. Overfishing and pollution from gold mine tailings resulted in the decline of the fishery. It was replaced by a penaeid white shrimp fishery on the South Atlantic and Gulf coasts. These shrimp were so abundant that beaches were piled with windrows from their moults. Modern industrial shrimping methods originated in this area.

""For shrimp to develop into one of the world's most popular foods, it took the simultaneous development of the otter trawl... and the internal combustion engine." Shrimp trawling can capture shrimp in huge volumes by dragging a net along the seafloor. Trawling was first recorded in England in 1376, when King Edward III received a request that he ban this new and destructive way of fishing. In 1583, the Dutch banned shrimp trawling in estuaries.

In the 1920s, diesel engines were adapted for use in shrimp boats. Power winches were connected to the engines, and only small crews were needed to rapidly lift heavy nets on board and empty them. Shrimp boats became larger, faster, and more capable. New fishing grounds could be explored, trawls could be deployed in deeper offshore waters, and shrimp could be tracked and caught round the year, instead of seasonally as in earlier times. Larger boats trawled offshore and smaller boats worked bays and estuaries. By the 1960s, steel and fibreglass hulls further strengthened shrimp boats, so they could trawl heavier nets, and steady advances in electronics, radar, sonar, and GPS resulted in more sophisticated and capable shrimp fleets.

As shrimp fishing methods industrialised, parallel changes were happening in the way shrimp were processed. "In the 19th century, sun dried shrimp were largely replaced by canneries. In the 20th century, the canneries were replaced with freezers."

In the 1970s, significant shrimp farming was initiated, particularly in China. The farming accelerated during the 1980s as the quantity of shrimp demand exceeded the quantity supplied, and as excessive bycatch and threats to endangered sea turtles became associated with trawling for wild shrimp. In 2007, the production of farmed shrimp exceeded the capture of wild shrimp.

Commercial species 
Although there are thousands of species of shrimp worldwide, only about 20 of these species are commercially significant. The following table contains the principal commercial shrimp, the seven most harvested species. All of them are decapods; most of them belong to the Dendrobranchiata and four of them are penaeid shrimp.

Fishing 

Commercial techniques for catching wild shrimp include otter trawls, seines and shrimp baiting. A system of nets is used when trawling. Baited traps are common in parts of the Pacific Northwest.

Shrimp trawling can result in very high incidental catch rates of non-target species. In 1997, the FAO found discard rates up to 20 pounds for every pound of shrimp. The world average was 5.7 pounds for every pound of shrimp. Trawl nets in general, and shrimp trawls in particular, have been identified as sources of mortality for species of finfish and cetaceans. Bycatch is often discarded dead or dying by the time it is returned to the sea, and may alter the ecological balance in discarded regions. Worldwide, shrimp trawl fisheries generate about 2% of the world's catch of fish in weight, but result in more than one third of the global bycatch total.

The most extensively fished species are the akiami paste shrimp, the northern prawn, the southern rough shrimp, and the giant tiger prawn. Together these four species account for nearly half of the total wild capture. In recent years, the global capture of wild shrimp has been overtaken by the harvest from farmed shrimp.

Farming 

A shrimp farm is an aquaculture business for the cultivation of marine shrimp or prawns for human consumption. Commercial shrimp farming began in the 1970s, and production grew steeply, particularly to match the market demands of the United States, Japan and Western Europe. The total global production of farmed shrimp reached more than 1.6 million tonnes in 2003, representing a value of nearly 9 billion U.S. dollars. About 75% of farmed shrimp are produced in Asia, in particular in China, Thailand, Indonesia, India and Vietnam. The other 25% are produced mainly in Latin America, where Brazil is the largest producer. By 2016, the largest exporting nation is India, followed by Ecuador, Thailand, Indonesia and China.

As can be seen from the global production chart on the left, significant aquaculture production started slowly in the 1970s and then rapidly expanded during the 1980s. After a lull in growth during the 1990s, due to pathogens, production took off again and by 2007 exceeded the capture from wild fisheries. By 2010, the aquaculture harvest was 3.9 million tonnes, compared to 3.1 million tonnes for the capture of wild shrimp.

In the earlier years of marine shrimp farming the preferred species was the large giant tiger prawn. This species is reared in circular holding tanks where they think they are in the open ocean, and swim in "never ending migration" around the circumference of the tank. In 2000, global production was 630,984 tonnes, compared to only 146,362 tonnes for whiteleg shrimp. Subsequently, these positions reversed, and by 2010 the production of giant tiger prawn increased modestly to 781,581 tonnes while whiteleg shrimp rocketed nearly twenty-fold to 2,720,929 tonnes. The whiteleg shrimp is currently the dominant species in shrimp farming. It is a moderately large shrimp reaching a total length of 230 mm (9"), and is particularly suited to farming because it "breeds well in captivity, can be stocked at small sizes, grows fast and at uniform rates, has comparatively low protein requirements... and adapts well to variable environmental conditions." In China, prawns are cultured along with sea cucumbers and some fish species, in integrated multi-trophic systems.

The major producer of farmed shrimp is China. Other significant producers are Thailand, Indonesia, India, Vietnam, Brazil, Ecuador and Bangladesh. Most farmed shrimp is exported to the United States, the European Union and Japan, also other Asian markets, including South Korea, Hong Kong, Taiwan and Singapore.

Investigations by The Guardian in 2014 and The Associated Press in 2015 found human rights abuses on fishing boats operated by Thailand. The boats are manned with slaves, and catch shrimp and fish (including fish for the production of fishmeal which is fed to farmed prawns). Greenpeace has challenged the sustainability of tropical shrimp farming practices on the grounds that farming these species "has led to the destruction of vast areas of mangroves in several countries [and] over-fishing of juvenile shrimp from the wild to supply farms." Greenpeace has placed a number of the prominent tropical shrimp species that are farmed commercially on its seafood red list, including the whiteleg shrimp, Indian prawn and giant tiger shrimp.

As food 

Shrimp are marketed and commercialized with several issues in mind. Most shrimp are sold frozen and marketed based on their categorization of presentation, grading, colour, and uniformity. Shrimp have high levels of omega-3 fatty acids and low levels of mercury. Usually shrimp is sold whole, though sometimes only the meat of shrimp is marketed.

As with other seafood, shrimp is high in calcium, iodine and protein but low in food energy. A shrimp-based meal is also a significant source of cholesterol, from 122 mg to 251 mg per 100 g of shrimp, depending on the method of preparation. Shrimp consumption, however, is considered healthy for the circulatory system because the lack of significant levels of saturated fat in shrimp means that the high cholesterol content in shrimp actually improves the ratio of LDL to HDL cholesterol and lowers triglycerides.

Ebiko - shrimp roe, sometimes translated as "shrimp flakes" - is used as one of the ingredients in the preparation of sushi.

Shrimp and other shellfish are among the most common food allergens. They are not kosher and thus are forbidden in Jewish cuisine.

Aquaria 
Several types of shrimp are kept in home aquaria. Some are purely ornamental, while others are useful in controlling algae and removing debris. Freshwater shrimp commonly available for aquaria include the Bamboo shrimp, Japanese marsh shrimp (Caridina multidentata, also called "Amano shrimp," as their use in aquaria was pioneered by Takashi Amano), cherry shrimp (Neocaridina heteropoda), and ghost or glass shrimp (Palaemonetes spp.). Popular saltwater shrimp include the cleaner shrimp Lysmata amboinensis, the fire shrimp (Lysmata debelius) and the harlequin shrimp (Hymenocera picta).

Shrimp versus prawn 

The terms shrimp and prawn are common names, not scientific names. They are vernacular or colloquial terms, which lack the formal definition of scientific terms. They are not taxa, but are terms of convenience with little circumscriptional significance. There is no reason to avoid using the terms shrimp or prawn when convenient, but it is important not to confuse them with the names or relationships of actual taxa.

According to the crustacean taxonomist Tin-Yam Chan, "The terms shrimp and prawn have no definite reference to any known taxonomic groups. Although the term shrimp is sometimes applied to smaller species, while prawn is more often used for larger forms, there is no clear distinction between both terms and their usage is often confused or even reverse in different countries or regions." Writing in 1980, L. B. Holthuis noted that the terms prawn and shrimp were used inconsistently "even within a single region", generalising that larger species fished commercially were generally called shrimp in the United States, and prawns in other English-speaking countries, although not without exceptions.

A lot of confusion surrounds the scope of the term shrimp. Part of the confusion originates with the association of smallness. That creates problems with shrimp-like species that are not small. The expression "jumbo shrimp" can be viewed as an oxymoron, a problem that does not exist with the commercial designation "jumbo prawns".

The term shrimp originated around the 14th century with the Middle English , akin to the Middle Low German , and meaning to contract or wrinkle; and the Old Norse , meaning to shrivel up, or skreppa, meaning a thin person. It is not clear where the term prawn originated, but early forms of the word surfaced in England in the early 15th century as prayne, praine and prane. According to the linguist Anatoly Liberman it is unclear how shrimp, in English, came to be associated with small. "No Germanic language associates the shrimp with its size... The same holds for Romance... it remains unclear in what circumstances the name was applied to the crustacean."

Taxonomic studies in Europe on shrimp and prawns were shaped by the common shrimp and the common prawn, both found in huge numbers along the European coastlines. The common shrimp, Crangon crangon, was categorised in 1758 by Carl Linnaeus, and the common prawn, Palaemon serratus, was categorised in 1777 by Thomas Pennant. The common shrimp is a small burrowing species aligned with the notion of a shrimp as being something small, whereas the common prawn is much larger. The terms true shrimp or true prawn are sometimes used to mean what a particular person thinks is a shrimp or prawn. This varies with the person using the terms. But such terms are not normally used in the scientific literature, because the terms shrimp and prawn themselves lack scientific standing. Over the years the way shrimp and prawn are used has changed, and nowadays the terms are almost interchangeable. Although from time to time some biologists declare that certain common names should be confined to specific taxa, the popular use of these names seems to continue unchanged.

Fossils
Only 57 exclusively fossil species are known in the shrimp fossil record. The earliest dates from the Lower Jurassic, followed by specimens from the Cretaceous.

See also 

 Pain in crustaceans

References

Further reading 

 Bauer, Raymond T (2004) "Remarkable Shrimps: Adaptations and Natural History of the Carideans" University of Oklahoma Press. .
 
 Fransen CHJM and De Grave S (2009) "Evolution and radiation of shrimp-like decapods: an overview" In: Martin J.W., Crandall K.A., Felder D.L. (eds.), Decapod Crustacean Phylogenetics. CRC Press, pp. 246–259.
 Kaplan, Eugene H (2010) Sensuous Seas: Tales of a Marine Biologist Princeton University Press. .
 Meyer R, Lochner S and Melzer RR (2009) Decapoda – Crabs, Shrimps & Lobsters  pp. 623–670 In: Häussermann V and Förstera G (eds) Marine Benthic Fauna of Chilean Patagonia: Illustrated Identification Guide", Nature in Focus. .
 Poore, Gary (2004) [https://books.google.com/books?id=ZZWnuGc0xlMC Marine Decapod Crustacea of Southern Australia: A Guide to Identification"] Csiro Publishing. .
 Fearnley-Whittingstall, H and Fisher N (2007) The River Cottage Fish Book Page 541–543, Bloomsbury Publishing. .
 Roberts, Callum (2009) The unnatural history of the sea Island Press. .
 Rudloe, Jack and Rudloe, Anne (2009) Shrimp: The Endless Quest for Pink Gold FT Press. .
 Ruppert EE, Fox RS and Barnes RD (2004)  Invertebrate zoology: A functional evolutionary approach 7th edition, Thomson-Brooks/Cole. .

External links 

 "Internal and External Anatomy of a Penaeid Shrimp" Fisheries Technical Paper 395, FAO, Rome.
 Shrimp versus prawn
 shrimp,lobster,crab ngrams
  Shrimp versus prawns – YouTube
 

Commercial crustaceans
Decapods
Edible crustaceans
Seafood
Arthropod common names